Makassarese may refer to:

 Makassarese people, an ethnic group indigenous to South Sulawesi province, Indonesia
 Makassarese language, language of Makassarese people, at the South Sulawesi, Indonesia
 Makassarese cuisine, a cooking tradition and culinary culture of Makassarese people

See also
 Macassar (disambiguation)